Vassilis Papadopoulos may refer to:
 Vassilis Papadopoulos (diplomat)
 Vassilis Papadopoulos (basketball)

See also
 Vasilios Papadopoulos, Greek professional footballer